Christmas Ship may refer to:

Christmas ships, parades of decorated boats for Christmas
The Rouse Simmons, a Christmas tree ship which sank in 1912